Giovanni Lajolo (born 3 January 1935 in Novara, Italy) is a cardinal and former president of the Pontifical Commission for Vatican City State and president of the Governatorate of Vatican City State.

Early life and ordination
He studied at the Seminary of Novara, the Pontifical Roman Seminary, and the Pontifical Gregorian University where he earned a licentiate in philosophy in 1955 and a licentiate in theology in 1959. He was ordained a priest on 29 April 1960. He entered the University of Munich where he studied for a doctorate in canon law which he was awarded in 1965. Then in 1965 he entered the elite Pontifical Ecclesiastical Academy to study diplomacy, leaving in 1968.

Secretariat of State
He entered the service of the Secretariat of State in 1970. He worked in the nunciature in Germany collaborating with Corrado Bafile, future cardinal, from 1970 to November 1974. He was a staff member of the Council for Public Affairs of the Church from November 1974. He was named counselor of nunciature on 1 January 1983. He closely followed the negotiations that led to the signing, in 1984, of the revision of the concordat between Italy and Holy See.

Bishop
On 3 October 1988, Lajolo was appointed Secretary of the Administration of the Patrimony of the Apostolic See and Titular Archbishop of Caesariana by Pope John Paul II. He received his episcopal consecration on 6 January 1989 from John Paul himself, with archbishops Edward Idris Cassidy and José Tomás Sánchez serving as co-consecrators, in St. Peter's Basilica. Lajolo was later named Nuncio to Germany on 7 December 1995, and Secretary for Relations with States on 7 October 2003. As Secretary, he served as the foreign minister of the Vatican.

Secretary for Relations with States
He served as the Secretary for Relations with States in the Secretariat of State, or foreign minister of the Holy See, from 2003 until his appointment as president in 2006. He speaks Italian, German, English and French.

At a 2004 conference Archbishop Lajolo said that perfect religious freedom does not exist in any country in the world. "Even in states in which the right to religious freedom is taken very seriously," he said, perfection is missing, often because a concern for church-state separation leads to penalising religious activity in the public sphere. He went on to say he said, government and taxation policies may limit the rights of parents to choose a religious education for their children or may penalise the charitable work of the church by not recognising its nonprofit status. Attempts to ban religiously motivated positions from public policy debates are also infringements on religious freedom, he said. Archbishop Lajolo and other speakers at the conference also voiced concern about the increasing threats to Christians in Iraq and in other countries with a Muslim majority following the U.S.-led invasion of Iraq.

In 2005 Archbishop Lajolo was awarded Knight Grand Cross of the Order of Merit of the Italian Republic.

Pontifical Commission for Vatican City State
On 22 June 2006, Lajolo was appointed President of the Pontifical Commission for Vatican City State and of the Governorate of Vatican City State by Pope Benedict XVI. In virtue of these two posts, he is delegated legislative and executive authority over the Vatican City by the pope. He was appointed Cardinal-Deacon of S. Maria Liberatrice a Monte Testaccio in the consistory of 24 November 2007.

As required by canon law he submitted his resignation to Pope Benedict having reached his 75th year in January 2010. His resignation was accepted on 3 September 2011, with Archbishop Giuseppe Bertello appointed as his successor starting on 1 October 2011.

He was one of the cardinal electors who participated in the 2013 papal conclave that selected Pope Francis.

Curial work
He was granted membership in the Congregation for Bishops, Pontifical Council for Culture, and Administration of the Patrimony of the Apostolic See (of which he had once been Secretary) on 12 June 2008. On 25 January 2010 he was appointed as a member of the Apostolic Signatura, the Church's highest court. He remained as a member of these bodies until his 80th birthday in 2015.

References

External links

 
Catholic-Hierarchy.org profile
Catholic-pages bio
Cardinal Lajolo(2006),Today's world and the ideology of power. General Debate of the 61st session of the General Assembly of the United Nations

1935 births
Presidents of the Pontifical Commission for Vatican City State
21st-century Italian Roman Catholic titular archbishops
Apostolic Nuncios to Germany
Pontifical Ecclesiastical Academy alumni
Pontifical Gregorian University alumni
Pontifical Roman Seminary alumni
Cardinals created by Pope Benedict XVI
21st-century Italian cardinals
20th-century Italian Roman Catholic titular archbishops
Grand Crosses with Star and Sash of the Order of Merit of the Federal Republic of Germany
Living people
Ludwig Maximilian University of Munich alumni
Members of the Apostolic Signatura
Members of the Congregation for Bishops
Members of the Pontifical Council for Culture
People from Novara
Secretaries for Relations with States of the Holy See
Knights Grand Cross of the Order of Merit of the Italian Republic